Tom McDonald (born 1954) was the United States Ambassador to Zimbabwe from 1997 to 2001. A graduate of George Washington University and the University of Minnesota Law School, McDonald is now an attorney in the Washington, D.C. office of the Columbus, Ohio firm of Vorys Sater. He is a member of the Council of American Ambassadors and the Council on Foreign Relations.

References 

Living people
Lawyers from Washington, D.C.
George Washington University alumni
University of Minnesota Law School alumni
Ambassadors of the United States to Zimbabwe
1953 births
20th-century American diplomats
21st-century American diplomats
People associated with BakerHostetler
People from Binghamton, New York